Bob Lamey (born December 23, 1938) is an American sportscaster, formerly the radio play-by-play announcer for the Indianapolis Colts of the National Football League. Lamey had been "The Voice of the Colts" after the team moved to Indianapolis in 1984, except from 1992-94, serving in that capacity until his retirement in 2018.

Biography
Lamey previously served as radio voice of the NBA's Indiana Pacers (1977–84) and two defunct hockey teams, the Indianapolis Racers of the WHA and the Indianapolis Checkers of the IHL. Affectionately known as "Hockey Bob" upon first arriving on the Indianapolis sports scene in the 1970s, Lamey was also sports director of Indianapolis radio station WIBC and, from 1988 to 2000, worked as a turn reporter on the Indianapolis Motor Speedway Radio Network. He also provided play-by-play for the national telecast of the 100th Monon Bell Classic.

Prior to coming to Indianapolis, Lamey served for five years as the voice of the ABA's Carolina Cougars. He served as sports director of WSOC-TV in Charlotte, NC, after the departure of Bill "Mouth of the South" Currie. Lamey also broadcast Charlotte Checkers (Eastern Hockey League) games from 1964 to 1968 on WSOC 930AM.

Retirement
In August 2018, Lamey suddenly announced his retirement. A report revealed he had used an uncensored racial slur while telling a story to an African American colleague. Lamey claimed that he was repeating a story told to him by racing driver Derek Daly, who was promptly fired from his job with WISH-TV, whose son, Conor Daly, also lost a sponsorship from Eli Lilly and Company. Daly disputes Lamey's story, which led to him filing suit against Lamey. In 2021, the charge of conspiracy to defraud against Lamey was dismissed, but he faces five counts of defamation, tortuous interference of business, tortuous interference of a business relationship, and another count of punitive damages.

Personal life
Lamy was born in Chester, Pennsylvania but grew up in Victoria, Texas. He graduated from Texas Christian University and later earned a master's degree from Ohio University. Lamey lives with his second wife, Kim, in Indianapolis. He has three daughters, two stepdaughters, and one stepson. He has seven grandchildren and five step-grandchildren.

Lamey is a "die-hard" New York Yankees fan.

References

Tom James Colts Scene: Indianapolis heads to Dallas to open up preseason Trib Star August 8, 2007
Tom James Colts still hungry; ready to defend their Super Bowl championship Trib Star July 29, 2007
 Profile in Indianapolis Star December 17, 2009

1938 births
American Basketball Association announcers
American radio sports announcers
American television sports announcers
Indiana Pacers announcers
Indianapolis Colts announcers
Living people
National Basketball Association broadcasters
National Football League announcers
Ohio University alumni
People from Chester, Pennsylvania
People from Victoria, Texas
Texas Christian University alumni
World Hockey Association broadcasters